Danny Moir (born May 23, 1980) is a Canadian former competitive ice dancer. He competed for most of his career with his cousin Sheri Moir. They are the 2001 Canadian national junior silver medalists and placed 11th at the 2001 World Junior Championships. They competed for two seasons on the Junior Grand Prix and placed 11th at the 2001 Nebelhorn Trophy. After that partnership ended, Moir competed with Kristina Lenko in the 2002-2003 season.

Moir now coaches in Copenhagen, Denmark. He is the older brother of Olympic gold medalist Scott Moir.

References

External links
 

Canadian male ice dancers
1980 births
Living people
Sportspeople from London, Ontario
Skating people from Ontario
21st-century Canadian people